Charles Henry Hart (February 4, 1847, Philadelphia – July 29, 1918, New York City) was an American art expert and author.

Biography
He received a classical and scientific education, and studied law. He was admitted to the bar in 1868 and graduated at the University of Pennsylvania the next spring. In 1894, he received severe injuries in a train accident. On recovering, he decided to give up the practice of law and devote himself to literature and art, though even while active as a lawyer he found time for literary activities.

In 1865, he was elected secretary of the Numismatic and Antiquarian Society of Philadelphia, and three years later became its historiographer. He did much literary work in connection with this society. From 1882 to 1902 he was director of the Pennsylvania Academy of the Fine Arts and in 1893 was chairman of the committee on retrospective American art at the World's Columbian Exposition.

His specialty in art was historical portraiture, in particular the work of Gilbert Stuart.  He actively publicized works he believed to be mislabeled, in particular being concerned to prevent the purchase of such works by misled buyers.

Publications
His numerous publications include: 
 Memoir of William Hickling Prescott, A Historian of Spain, Mexico, and Peru (Boston: D. Clapp & Son, 1868) 
Bibliographia Lincolniana, reprinted under the title Biographical Sketch of Abraham Lincoln (1870)

Abraham Lincoln's Place in History (1900)
Edward Savage, Painter and Engraver (1905)
Who Was the Mother of Franklin's Son? (1911)
Memoirs of the Life and Works of Jean Houdon (1912), in collaboration with E. Biddle

Notes

References

American biographers
American male biographers
Writers from Philadelphia
1847 births
1918 deaths
University of Pennsylvania alumni
People associated with the Pennsylvania Academy of the Fine Arts
American art historians
World's Columbian Exposition
19th-century American lawyers